Lalganj ( in Hindi : लालगंज ) is a block in Vaishali district, Bihar state. It is also the birthplace of veteran IPS and former Governor of Kerala and Nagaland Shri Nikhil Kumar Singh.According to census website all blocks in  bihar state  Nomenclature as C.D.Block ( community development blocks

Block  office

major roads
SH-74

villages
Number of Panchayat : 21
Number  of Villages : 92

panchayat

Villages

Population and communities
Male Population : 105532  (2009 ist.)
female Population : 98197  
Total Population : 203729 
SC Total Population : 44009 
ST Total Population : 495
Minority Total Population : 15252 
Population Density : 1345  
Sex Ratio : 930

public distribution system
Nos of HHs : 31082
BPL Card Holders : 32880
Antodaya Card Holders : 6937
Annapurna Card Holders : 238
APL : 17289
Nos of Fair Price Shops: 104

Education
literacy rate : 51% (2001 ist.)
male literacy rate : 63%
Female literacy rate : 38%

School
Primary School : 101 (2009 ist.)
Upper Primary School : 83

Banking
number of bank : 6

References 

Community development blocks in Vaishali district